Lagny-sur-Marne (literally Lagny on Marne) is a commune in the eastern suburbs of Paris, France. It is located in the Seine-et-Marne department in the Île-de-France  from the centre of Paris.

The commune of Lagny-sur-Marne is part of the Val de Bussy sector, one of the four sectors in the "new town" of Marne-la-Vallée.

History
From 644, Lagny-sur-Marne was the site of Lagny Abbey, a monastery founded that year, and after its destruction by the Normans refounded about 990. The monastery was seized by the state at the French Revolution and its buildings are used since 1842 as the offices of the municipality.

During the Middle Ages Lagny-sur-Marne was one of the most popular places for tourneys in Northern France. In November 1179 a notable tournament was held by Louis VII of France in honour of the coronation of his son.

In 1170, the young knight Baldwin of Bethune and his lifelong friend, William Marshal were at  the court of Henry the Young King. In 1180 at the great international tournament of Lagny, Baldwin was a knight banneret, leading the Flemish team while William headed the English team.

In 1846, Lagny-sur-Marne annexed the commune of Saint-Denis-du-Port.

Demographics
Inhabitants are called Latignaciens or Laniaques.

Economy
When Titus Interactive was active, its head office was in Lagny-sur-Marne.

Transport
Lagny-sur-Marne is served by the Lagny – Thorigny station, on the Transilien Paris – Est suburban rail line. The station, although administratively located in neighbouring commune of Thorigny-sur-Marne, is immediately across the river Marne from the centre of Lagny-sur-Marne.

Education
The commune has ten preschools and nine elementary schools. There are two junior high schools, Collège Les 4 Arpents and Collège Marcel Rivière, as well as one senior high school/sixth-form college, Lycée Van Dongen.

Twin towns
Lagny-sur-Marne is twinned with Sainte-Agathe-des-Monts, Quebec in Canada since 1969, and also with  Alnwick, Northumberland in United Kingdom.

Notable residents 
Christopher Jullien, footballer
Paul Pogba – footballer
Christopher Nkunku - footballer
Benjamin Boukpeti – Togolese canoeist who won a bronze medal in the 2008 Summer Olympics, which was Togo's first ever Olympic medal.
 Valéry Aubertin (born 1970), the organist and composer, was born in Lagny-sur-Marne
 It is possible that the Irish family de Lany came from Lagny-sur-Marne.
Édouard Cortès, (1882-1969), Post-Impressionist painter

See also

Communes of the Seine-et-Marne department

References

External links

 Official site 
1999 Land Use, from IAURIF (Institute for Urban Planning and Development of the Paris-Île-de-France région) 

Communes of Seine-et-Marne
Val de Bussy
Champagne (province)